The 1963 Australian Championships was a tennis tournament that took place on outdoor Grass courts at the Memorial Drive, Adelaide, Australia from 10 January to 19 January. It was the 51st edition of the Australian Championships (now known as the Australian Open), the 13th held in Adelaide, and the first Grand Slam tournament of the year.

Champions

Men's singles

 Roy Emerson defeated  Ken Fletcher  6–3, 6–3, 6–1

Women's singles

 Margaret Smith defeated  Jan Lehane  6–2, 6–2

Men's doubles
 Bob Hewitt /  Fred Stolle  defeated  Ken Fletcher /  John Newcombe 6–2, 1–6, 6–3, 3–6, 6–3

Women's doubles
 Robyn Ebbern /  Margaret Smith defeated  Jan Lehane /  Lesley Turner 6–1, 6–3

Mixed doubles
 Margaret Smith /  Ken Fletcher defeated   Lesley Turner /  Fred Stolle 7–5, 5–7, 6–4

References

External links
 Australian Open official website

Australian Championships
Australian Championships (tennis) by year
January 1963 sports events in Australia